Ivanov, Ivanoff or Ivanow (masculine), or Ivanova (feminine) is one of the most common surnames in Russia and Bulgaria. The surname is derived from the male given name Ivan (related to John) and literally means "Ivan's".

People with the surname
Alena Ivanova, Kazakhstani volleyball player
Alexander Ivanov (disambiguation) – several people
Alexey Ivanov (disambiguation) – several people
Alina Ivanova (born 1969), Russian race walker and long-distance runner
Allen Ivanov, American mass shooter, responsible for the 2016 Mukilteo shooting
Almaz Ivanov (died 1669), Russian statesman
Alexander Andreyevich Ivanov (1806-1858), Russian painter
Anatoli Ivanov (musician) (1934–2012), Russian solo-timpanist and percussionist with the Saint Petersburg Philharmonic Orchestra
Andrey Ivanovich Ivanov (1775-1848), Russian painter (father of Alexander Andreyevich)
Anton Ivanov-Goluboy (1818–1863), Russian painter
Artyom Ivanov (disambiguation) – several people
Clement Ivanov, Estonian e-sport player known as Puppey
Daniel Ivanov (disambiguation) – several people
Desislava Ivanova Doneva (born 1979), Bulgarian singer better known as Desi Slava
Dimitar Ivanov Popov (1894–1975), Bulgarian organic chemist
Dimitrana Ivanova (1881–1960), Bulgarian reform pedagogue, suffragist and women's rights activist
Dimitar Ivanov Stoyanov (1877–1949), Bulgarian writer better known as Elin Pelin
Dmytro Ivanov (born 1989), Ukrainian footballer
Elena Ivanova, Russian figure skater
Georgi Ivanov (disambiguation) – several people
Georgy Ivanov (1894–1958), leading poet of the Russian emigration
Georgy Vasilyevich Ivanov (1901–2001), Hero of the Soviet Union
Gjorge Ivanov (born 1960), President of North Macedonia
Igor Petrovich Ivanov (1923–1992), Russian pedagogue
Igor Vasilyevich Ivanov (1947–2005), Russian-born Canadian chess player
Igor Ivanov (born 1945), Russian foreign minister
Igor Ivanov (Scouting), Russian scout leader
Ilya Ivanovich Ivanov (1870 – c. 1932), Russian biologist
Ivan Ivanov (disambiguation) – several people
Ive Ivanov, (born 1985), Croatian basketball player
Ivo Ivanov (disambiguation) – several people
Kira Ivanova (1963–2001), Russian figure skater
Konstantin Ivanov (disambiguation), several people
Kristo Ivanov (born 1937), Swedish information scientist and systems scientist
Kurbat Ivanov (died 1666), Cossack explorer
Lea Ivanova, Bulgarian singer
Leonid Ivanov (disambiguation), several people
Lev Ivanov (1834–1901), Russian choreographer
Lili Ivanova (born 1939), Bulgarian singer
Lyubomir Ivanov, Bulgarian scientist, non-governmental activist, and Antarctic explorer
Lyubov Ivanova (born 1981), Russian long-distance runner
Maxim Ivanov (disambiguation) – several people
Mike Ivanow (born 1948), American soccer goalkeeper
Mikhail Ivanov (cross-country skier) (born 1977), Russian cross country skier
Mikhail Ivanov (composer) (1849–1927), Russian composer and critic
Mikhail Ippolitov-Ivanov (1859–1939), Russian composer, conductor, and pedagogue
Mirela Ivanova (born 1962), modern Bulgarian poet
Miroslav Ivanov (writer) (1929–1999), Czech non-fiction writer
Miroslav Ivanov (footballer) (born 1981), Bulgarian footballer
Nikita Ivanov (born 1989), Kazakhstani ice hockey player
Nikita Ivanov (politician) (born 1974), Russian politician
Nina Ivanova (1934–2020), Russian actress
Natalia Ivanova (disambiguation) – several people
Nikolay Ivanov (disambiguation) – several people
Nicolas Ivanoff (born 1969), French pilot and flying instructor
Oleksandr Ivanov (born 1965), Ukrainian football player and manager
Olga Ivanova (disambiguation) – several people
Olimpiada Ivanova (born 1979), Russian athlete
Piotr Pavlovich Ivanov (1878–1942), Russian and Soviet embryologist
Pavlo Ivanov (born 1984), Ukrainian footballer
Porfiry Ivanov (1898–1983), Russian religious leader
Razumnik Ivanov-Razumnik, Russian politician
Robert Ivanov (born 1994), Finnish footballer
Semion Ivanov (1907–1993), Soviet general
Sergey Ivanov (disambiguation) – several people
Sofia Ivanova (born 2005), Bulgarian rhythmic gymnast 
Trifon Ivanov (1965–2016), Bulgarian football player
Valentin D. Ivanov (born 1967), Bulgarian astronomer and science fiction writer
Valentin Kozmich Ivanov (1934–2011), Soviet football player
Valentin Valentinovich Ivanov (born 1961), Russian football referee
Valentina Ivanova (born 1963), Russian discus thrower
Varvara Ivanova (born 1987), Russian virtuoso harpist
Vasili Ivanov (born 1970), Russian football player
Viktor Ivanov (born 1950), Russian politician
Viktor Semyonovich Ivanov (1909–1968), Soviet poster artist
Vitali Vladimirovich Ivanov (born 1976), Russian handball player
Violeta G. Ivanova, Bulgarian astronomer
Vladimir Ivanov (disambiguation) – several people
Vladislav Ivanov (disambiguation) – several people
Volodymyr Ivanov (volleyball), Ukrainian volleyball player and Olympic gold medalist
Vsevolod Ivanov (1895–1963), Soviet writer
Vyacheslav Ivanov (disambiguation) – several people
Xenophont Ivanov (1898–1967), Bulgarian veterinary scholar
Yanis Ivanov, Soviet composer and People's Artist of the USSR
Yehor Ivanov (born 1991), Ukrainian footballer
Yevgeny Ivanov (disambiguation) – several people
Yulia Ivanova (disambiguation) – several people
Yury Ivanov (disambiguation) – several people
Zinaida Ivanova (1865–1913), Russian writer and translator
Jerzy Iwanow-Szajnowicz (1911–1943) Greek-Polish athlete and saboteur

Fictional characters 
Nikolai Ivanov, the central character of the 1887 play Ivanov by Anton Chekhov
D. D. Ivanov, in the Macross universe
Pola Ivanova, from the James Bond film, A View to a Kill
Susan Ivanova, in the Babylon 5 universe
Yuriy Ivanov, in the Beyblade anime series
Ivanova, in Harry Potter who plays as a chaser for the Bulgarian Quidditch team
Katerina Ivanovna, one of the characters in Crime and Punishment by Dostoyevsky.

Other 
 Ivanov (play), by the Russian playwright Anton Chekhov
 Production codename of Sukhoi Su-2, Soviet bomber aircraft

See also 
Ivanović (includes Ivanovich)
Ivanoff (disambiguation)
Ivanovsky (disambiguation)
Ivanovski
Ivanovo

References and notes

Bulgarian-language surnames
Russian-language surnames
Surnames of Russian origin
Patronymic surnames
Macedonian-language surnames
Surnames from given names